Amreli Steels Limited is a publicly held Pakistani company which manufactures steel rebars. It is based in Karachi, Pakistan.

History
It was founded in 1972 by Abbas Akberali and is named after Amreli District, Gujarat, India from where their ancestors migrated to Pakistan.

As of 2013, the company's production capacity was estimated to be 150,000 tonnes, which by 2017 had increased to 180,000 tonnes.

In 2018, the company established a new production facility in Dhabeji with a 400,000 tonnes capacity.  A strategic goal of the firm has been to be the first Pakistani company to reach annual production of 1 million tonnes of rebar product.

Amreli transitioned from a private to public firm in 2015, when it was listed on the Pakistan Stock Exchange following an initial public offering in October 2015.

Capacity Expansion 
Amreli Steels cemented its dominance and leadership in Pakistan's Steel Industry in March 2019 by expanding its manufacturing facilities that increased its rebar capacity to 605,000 tonnes and billet capacity to 600,000 tonnes per annum. The new facilities have enabled the company to maintain its cost leadership and provide a better product to its customers. Amreli Steels expects that the economies of scale and new technologies will further help it cut manufacturing costs, spread fixed costs and as a result improve margins.

Financial Performance 
Amreli Steels’ posted Rs1.1 billion total loss for the fiscal year 2020, which resulted in Rs 3.79 loss per share.

Major Projects 

 Jinnah International Airport, Karachi
 Aga Khan University & Hospital, Karachi
 Allama Iqbal International Airport, Lahore
 LuckyOne Mall, Karachi
 Benazir Bhutto International Airport, Islamabad/Rawalpindi
 Bagh-e-Jinnah, Karachi
 Chashma Nuclear Power Plant, Kundian
 DG Khan Cement, Chakwal
 Bestway Cement, Islamabad
 Fatima Fertilizers, Multan
 Fish Harbour, Karachi
 FTC Flyover, Karachi
 Gwadar Deep Sea Port, Karachi
 Hub Power Station, Balochistan
 Indus Highway Project, Karachi
 Japanese Consulate, Karachi
 Jinnah Bridge, Karachi
 Northern Bypass, Karachi
 Lakhra Coal Power Project, Jamshoro
 Lilly Bridge 2, Karachi
 Lucky Cement, Khyber Pakhtunkhwa
 Lucky Textile Mills, Karachi
 Lyari Expressway, Karachi
 MCB Tower, Karachi
 Meezan Bank, Headquarters, Karachi
 Mirani Dam, Balochistan
 National Refinery Limited, Karachi
 Northern Bypass, Karachi
 Ocean Tower & Mall, Karachi
 Packages Limited, Lahore
 Pakistan Broadcasting Corporation, Islamabad
 PARCO, Karachi
 Port Grand, Karachi
 Serena Hotel, Islamabad
 Shaheed-e-Millat Flyover, Karachi
 Shaukat Khanum Memorial Hospital, Lahore
 US Embassy, Afghanistan
 National Stadium, Karachi

References

Steel companies of Pakistan
Manufacturing companies established in 1972
Manufacturing companies based in Karachi
Pakistani brands
Companies listed on the Pakistan Stock Exchange
2015 initial public offerings
Pakistani companies established in 1972